Matthew Winkler may refer to:

 Matthew Winkler (journalist), an American journalist who is a co-founder and editor-in-chief of Bloomberg News
 Matthew Winkler (minister), a minister who was the victim in a high-profile murder case in 2006